BigID, Inc. is a New York based data management company based. The company sells software for managing sensitive and private data.

BigID was founded by Dimitri Sirota and Nimrod Vax in 2016, and is currently valued at $1.25 billion.

History 
BigID was established in 2016 with seed round funding of $2.1 million.

A Forbes article listed the company as one of the top 100 cloud computing. At the end of the year, the company had reached a valuation of one billion dollars.

In 2021, Inc 5000 listed BigID as the 19th fastest growing private company in America.

References

2016 establishments in New York (state)
Companies based in New York City
Computer security companies
Computer security software companies
Software companies established in 2016
Software companies of the United States